Shinobu Asagoe and Katarina Srebotnik were the defending champions, but lost in semifinals to tournament winners Elena Likhovtseva and Vera Zvonareva.

Likhovtseva and Zvonareva won the title by defeating Émilie Loit and Barbora Strýcová 6–3, 6–4 in the final.

Seeds

Draw

Draw

References
 Main and Qualifying Draws

WTA Auckland Open